The MV Wickersham was a mainline ferry vessel for the Alaska Marine Highway. Constructed just one year prior to its purchase by AMHS in April 1968, her arrival and status as an "oceangoing" vessel allowed AMHS to expand the southern terminus of its route system south to Washington and the Port of Seattle.

Due to the Passenger Services Act and laws of cabotage, however, the Wickersham could only undergo its Washington-Alaska voyages with an intermediate stop in Prince Rupert, British Columbia. Further complicating her service was her complicated bow unloading system which was only compatible with AMHS ports in Haines, Juneau, Ketchikan, and Sitka, in addition to the ports of Seattle and Prince Rupert. Her large size and draft which served her well in the turbulent waters of Dixon Entrance and other exposed portions of the Alaska-Washington voyage, were too great to slip through passages of water such as Peril Strait en route to Sitka, which forced her to approach Sitka from the outer coast of Baranof Island and through the Pacific Ocean.

References

External links
 

1967 ships
Ships built in Norway
Former Alaska Marine Highway System vessels